Andy Bathie is a sperm donor who was sued for child support in the United Kingdom.

He is from Enfield in the United Kingdom and worked as a fireman.  He became a private sperm donor to a lesbian couple.  He was later pursued by the Child Support Agency for maintenance payments, and ordered to pay. His case is significant because it was a test case for private sperm donors, and was widely reported in the media.

References

Sperm donors
Living people
Year of birth missing (living people)
People from Enfield, London
London Fire Brigade personnel